Khaled Daghriri (born 14 August 2001) is a Saudi Arabian professional footballer who plays as a right back for Saudi Professional League side Al-Faisaly.

Career
Daghriri started his career at the youth team of Al-Faisaly and represented the club at every level. He made his debut on 17 October 2020 in the league match against Al-Taawoun.

Honours

Club
Al-Faisaly
King Cup: 2020–21

References

External links
 

2001 births
Living people
Saudi Arabian footballers
Saudi Arabia youth international footballers
Association football fullbacks
Al-Faisaly FC players
Saudi Professional League players
Saudi First Division League players